Tankosićevo (Cyrillic: Танкосићево) is a neighborhood of Kisač, Serbia. In the past, Tankosićevo was a separate settlement, but was subsequently (in the 1970s) joined with Kisač.

Geography and features
Tankosićevo is located in the northern part of Kisač. It is connected to Novi Sad by Kisač bus line number 42.

Demographics

References
Slobodan Ćurčić, Broj stanovnika Vojvodine, Novi Sad, 1996.

See also
Kisač

Suburbs of Novi Sad